Chord Melodic (born Christopher Michael Hall, 27 November 1986) is a British actor. He is best known for his portrayal as Joe Haslam, in the ITV British soap opera Coronation Street and as Sledge, in the BBC One and AMC+ crime drama series Happy Valley.

He began his television career as an actor in 2008, starring in the BBC children's drama series Grange Hill and Drama's such as ITV's British crime drama Blue Murder. He is also a former professional footballer playing as a striker for Oldham Athletic.

Early life
Born in Manchester, England, on 27 November 1986, he is of English, Irish and West Indian (St Kitts and Nevis) ancestry.

Career

Football career

He came through the youth team at Oldham Athletic, playing as a striker. He was prolific at youth and reserve team levels, and thus made his debut for the club in 2003 at the age of 16, which made him the second youngest player of all time to make their debut for the club at the time, after Wayne Harrison debuted at 16 in 1985, who became the world's most expensive teenager, with his record-breaking transfer from Oldham Athletic to Liverpool. After progressing through the ranks at Boundary Park, he later earned his first professional contract. However, after he broke his leg in February 2007, he decided to retire from professional football to concentrate on his acting career. He made 7 starts and 36 substitute appearances, scoring five goals, most notably his late equalizer in the 2-2 FA Cup draw against Wolverhampton Wanderers FC at Molineux Stadium, which earned Oldham a third round replay. The club had earlier banned him from appearing in a theatrical performance of the Full Monty. However, he was later given the green light by club officials, when they went back on their decision to block his participation, after he had explained to them that it was all for charity. He then signed for non-League club Stalybridge Celtic in July 2007. He finished the season top goal scorer, scoring 19 goals in 49 appearances and was called up to the England C team, which represents the best non-league talent. At the end of the 2007–08 season he left to sign for Bradford Park Avenue, where he played until the end of the 2009–10 season, scoring 35 goals in 58 league appearances. In 2010, he had a brief spell at Mossley, playing twelve games. However, he returned to Stalybridge Celtic for the remainder of the 2012–13 season, scoring 6 goals in 13 appearances, before signing for Harrogate Town for the 2013–14 season. He finished the season, scoring 16 goals in 42 league appearances, before retiring from the game in 2014.

Acting career
Chord's first paid acting role was in 2007 for Hope Theatre Company in Manchester. He was one of the four original cast members of OUT/LOUD, the UK's longest running, anti-homophobia theatre project. It is a ground-breaking verbatim play devised by Adam Zane that explores homophobia, bullying and hate crime. The play is based on interviews with young LGBT+ people. He played a number of parts throughout the plays tour.

Melodic's major television debut came in 2008 when he starred in the British television children's drama series Grange Hill, where he appeared as ex-pupil and football superstar Dwayne Miller. Subsequent roles later that year included the BBC drama spin-off Spooks: Code 9 and ITV daytime drama serial The Royal Today.

He then spent three months portraying music producer Matt Crosby, in the British soap opera Hollyoaks, opposite Emma Rigby. Joining the cast in November 2008, and remaining there until his character's departure in January 2009.
 
Later that year, he landed a role on the ITV detective drama series Blue Murder, where he played biker Kyle Torrence, caught in the middle of a bitter and adulterous rivalry, between Helen the auntie, and her teenage niece Jess, his girlfriend, played by Holliday Grainger.

He followed that up with numerous roles including BAFTA Award-winning drama Shameless in 2011, and ITV's British drama series Scott & Bailey.

More recent projects included a guest appearance on Channel 4's comedy drama Coming Up (TV series), opposite Debra Stephenson, Con O'Neill, and Jodie Comer.

In 2015, Melodic starred in Sally Wainwright's BAFTA Award-winning crime drama series Happy Valley, as Sledge, opposite Sarah Lancashire and Charlie Murphy. In May 2015, Happy Valley won the BAFTA Award for Best Drama Series. This was the first of two Bafta's for Happy Valley, which won the same category in 2017.

He then made a guest appearance on British medical soap opera Doctors in 2016 as Police Constable Dave Blaire.

Following that, he later appeared in British medical drama television series Holby City in January 2018. He starred opposite Hugh Quarshie, as Dillon Matthews a prison kingpin, who takes Ric under his wing in order to expand his empire.

As of 2019, Chord has been starring in the ITV British soap opera Coronation Street as Joe Haslam, an ex-soldier and owner of a private military company, who helped to bring down super villain Pat Phelan.

Upcoming projects 
BBC and AMC Networks confirmed in October 2022, that Chord Melodic would be returning for the third series of Sally Wainwright’s multi-BAFTA award winning hit Happy Valley, alongside Sarah Lancashire.

Filmography

Television

References

External links

1986 births
Living people
English footballers
English male television actors
Male actors from Manchester
21st-century English male actors
Oldham Athletic A.F.C. players
Stalybridge Celtic F.C. players
Bradford (Park Avenue) A.F.C. players
Mossley A.F.C. players
Harrogate Town A.F.C. players
Association football forwards
Footballers from Manchester